Catherine McGuinness may refer to:

Catherine McGuinness (born 1934), Irish judge and senator
Catherine McGuinness (English politician), City of London politician